() is the biggest bank in Chiba Prefecture, Japan. Listed on the Nikkei 225, it has branches in Osaka, New York City, London, and Hong Kong. Assets — $106.1 billion (2015).

History 
Chiba bank was established in March 1943.

In June 1998, Standard & Poor's downgraded Chiba Bank' s credit rating from A-minus to BBB-plus because of negative long-term ratings.

In October 2008, Chiba Bank, jointly with The Daishi Bank and Hokkoku Bank, hired IBM to build a Call Center System common for the three banks. In July 2010, Chiba Bank joined the United Nations Environment Programme Finance Initiative (UNEP FI).

In October 2014, Chiba Bank is the first Japanese regional bank to sell dollar bonds, issuing $300 million of notes in US dollar that month.

Description 
The bank is headquartered in Chiba Prefecture, which lies adjacent to Japan's capital Tokyo on Tokyo Bay and has one of the most important industrial concentrations anywhere in Japan. The bank's strategy is to expand its branch network into adjacent prefectures along Tokyo-bound commuter rail lines. It is also putting an emphasis on developing southern Chiba Prefecture as a tourist and resort area, particularly around the city of Kamogawa.

Chiba Bank has a 36.6% market share of lending and a 23.0% share of all deposits in the prefecture. Of the bank's network of 173 branches, 154 are within Chiba Prefecture. Chiba Bank is the third-largest of Japan's 64 regional banking groups in terms of total assets. As of March 2008, it had total assets of ¥9.8 trillion and a loan portfolio topping ¥6.6 trillion, which also made it one of the world's 200 largest banks. The bank is one of the few banks that discloses net interest margins (NIM) on their lending.

References

External links
Official website 

Regional banks of Japan
1943 establishments in Japan